The Count of Monte Cristo (a.k.a. Le Comte de Monte Cristo) is a French-Italian four-part miniseries based on the 1844 novel The Count of Monte Cristo by Alexandre Dumas père.

Plot
Edmond Dantès is falsely accused of Bonapartism and sentenced to spend the rest of his life imprisoned in the dreaded Château d'If, an island fortress from which no prisoner has ever escaped, and to which the most dangerous political prisoners are sent. While imprisoned, he meets Abbé Faria, a fellow prisoner whom everyone believes to be mad. Abbé tells Edmond of a fantastic treasure hidden away on a tiny island, that only he knows the location. After many years in prison, the old Abbé dies, and Edmond escapes disguised as the dead body to find the treasure Abbé told him of, so he can use the new-found wealth to exact revenge on those who have wronged him.

Cast

 Gérard Depardieu as Edmond Dantès
 Sergio Rubini as Bertuccio
 Ornella Muti as Mercedes Igualada
 Jean Rochefort as Fernand Mondego
 Pierre Arditi as Villefort
 Florence Darel as Camille de la Richardais
 Georges Moustaki as Abbé Faria
 Guillaume Depardieu as young Edmond
 Naike Rivelli as young Mercedès
 Julie Depardieu as Valentine de Villefort
 Christopher Thompson as Maximilien Morrel
 Stanislas Merhar as Albert De Morcerf
 Hélène Vincent as Heloise De Villefort
 Michel Aumont as Baron Danglars
 Constanze Engelbrecht as Hermine Danglars
 Roland Blanche as Caderousse
 Jean-Claude Brialy as Pere Morrel
 Inés Sastre as Haydee
 Serge Merlin as Noirtier De Villefort
 Jean-Marc Thibault as Barrois
 Thierry de Peretti as Toussaint
 Patrick Bouchitey as Beauchamp
 Frédéric Gorny as Château-Renaud
 Stéphan Guérin-Tillié as Franz D'Épinay
 Dominique Besnehard as Defense Attorney
 Julien Rochefort as the young Fernand Mondego 
 Dimitri Rataud as the young Danglars 
 Michel Bompoil as the young Villefort 
 Arthur Nauzyciel as the young Caderousse 
 Didier Lesour as Boville
 Daniel Martin as Doctor D'avrigny
 Micheline Presle as Madame De Saint Meran
 Roger Dumas as Cocles
 Mattia Sbragia as Luigi Vampa
 Ubaldo Lo Presti as Pepino
 Jacques Boudet as President of the Assembly of Peers
 Albert Delpy as The host of a show

External links 
 

Films based on The Count of Monte Cristo
Television shows based on The Count of Monte Cristo
1998 films
1998 television films
1990s French television miniseries
Television series set in the 1810s
Television series set in the 1820s
Television series set in the 1830s
Films directed by Josée Dayan